Gloria Scott (Port Arthur, Texas, February 26, 1946) is an American soul singer

Her first recording I Taught Him by "Gloria Scott and the Tonettes", written and produced by Sylvester Stewart  (better known as Sly Stone), was released in 1964.

She was then under contract with Barry White, who produced a 1974 album What Am I Gonna Do, and a single Just as Long as We're Together (In My Life There Will Never Be Another) which reached the top 20 on numerous record charts. She recorded a second album with arranger H. B. Barnum but it was not released.

She was a member of The Ikettes, and a background singer for Mary Wilson (of the Supremes).

Scott is a regular performer at The Baltic Soul Weekender in Germany.

Musical career 
Her first 45 single was written and produced by Sylvester Stewart, better known as Sly Stone : "Gospel Singer Gloria Scott and the Tonettes cut I Taught Him with Sly in 1964. Reminiscent of girl groups like Martha and the Vandellas, The Shirelles and The Ronettes, Warner Brothers picked up this single for distribution." In an interview with Christian John Wikane of Popmatters, Scott says : "He [Sly] just kind of took me under his wing. I sang at the Cow Palace. Sly and his sister and his cousin LaTanya backed me up and they were called the Tonettes: Gloria Scott and the Tonettes."

She then became a member of The Ikettes. Tina Turner says in her autobiography: "After [previous Ikettes] Robbie, Jessie and Venetta walked out, Ike had quickly scooped up two inexperienced L.A. girls, Maxine Smith and Pat 'P.P.' Arnold, and a young club singer from Palo Alto named Gloria Scott.".

She later met and signed a 7-year contract with Barry White. White produced and arranged her first album, What Am I Gonna Do, which was released in 1974. Two tracks were released as singles. The album is notable for being the second released by Casablanca Records—label number NB0002 (NB0001 was by KISS). At that time Warner Brothers distributed the album, in multiple countries.

Roshad Ollison, writing in the Virginia Pilot, says "What Am I Gonna Do is among Barry's most pop-minded productions. Gloria's lone release, it is also a gem. … What Am I Gonna Do, a classy effort on par with Barry's best albums, soon faded away; Gloria did, too."

Her single "Just as Long as We're Together (In My Life There Will Never Be Another)" was also produced by Barry White. This song peaked at #14 on the Hot Dance charts, #16 on Billboard (Feb 22, 1975) Hot Soul Singles  and on the U.S. R&B. It was played on the famous TV show Soul Train.

Despite her 7-year contract with Barry White, and (indirectly) with Casablanca, her career failed to take off. PopMatters comments : "However, a combination of factors, including the growing pains of a new record company and White's focus on his own burgeoning career, ultimately limited the reach of What Am I Gonna Do. Though a follow-up single, 'Just As Long as We're Together', hit the R&B Top 20 and held the top spot on the Disco Singles chart in early-1975, the second album she recorded with arranger H. B. Barnum was not released. For all his solo success, Barry White was not delivering on his contract with Gloria Scott. He became one of the most seminal figures of the 1970s while Scott faded into obscurity."

She is credited as a backup singer on the 1979 self-titled album by Mary Wilson (of the Supremes), and in the late 1970s and early 1980s, also toured with Mary and fellow background singer, Karen Jackson.

Scott has performed every year since 2008 at The Baltic Soul Weekender in Germany. Her performance of Help Me Get Off This Merry-Go-Round, with the Baltic Soul Orchestra, was released as a single.

On September 30, 2022 Scott released her second album on Acid Jazz, titled So Wonderful.

Personal life 
Gloria Scott was born in Port Arthur but was raised in the city of Houston, before moving with her family to northern California when in her early teens. After her musical career in San Francisco and Los Angeles she spent 8 years in Guam.

She presently lives in Lake County, California.

Discography

Albums
 What Am I Gonna Do (Casablanca, 1974)
 So Wonderful (Acid Jazz, 2022)

Singles

 What Am I Gonna Do - (7", Single) Casablanca Records 1974
 What Shall I Do - (7", Single) Casablanca Records 1974
 Just As Long As We're Together (In My Life There Will Never Be Another) - (7", Single) Casablanca Records 1974
 (A Case Of) Too Much Love Makin' - Casablanca Records 1975
 You're Losing Me - Ann Sexton & Baltic Soul Orchestra/ Gloria Scott & Baltic Soul Orchestra - Unique 2009
 Help Me Get Off This Merry-Go-Round - Ann Sexton & Baltic Soul Orchestra/ Gloria Scott & Baltic Soul Orchestra - Unique 2009
 That's The Way Love Is - Sedsoul - 2010
 Can't Keep Running Away - Single - (2013)
 It's So Wonderful - Single - (2013)
 Never Gonna Let You Go - Single - (2013)
 Promised Land - Single - (2022)
 All of the Time, You're on my Mind - Single - (2022)
 So Wonderful - Single - (2022)

Backing vocal credits 

 1972: Bo Diddley – Where It All Began
 1979: Mary Wilson – Mary Wilson

Covers and Samples 
The B. Coming I Can’t Go On This Way / Love Me, Love Me or Leave Me, Leave Me

Benny The Butcher (feat. Freddie Gibbs) “One Way Flight” prod. by Hit-Boy and Jansport J.

Lisa Stansfield So Natural : Too Much Love Makin

Cultural References 
John Connolly in Nocturnes writes: "Jerry passed through the main gates to the Benson farm, instinctively turning down the truck radio, since Bruce didn't appreciate music much, and certainly not the stuff that was pouring out of Jerry's speakers just now: Gloria Scott's sultry vocals, backed up by the late, great Barry White's production skills."

References

External links
 Gloria Scott Facebook Page
 Gloria Scott : Google Play Store
 Gloria Scott  :  A Case Of Too Little Record Makin’ (Interview with Mama Edie, particularly covering her life)
 When the Need for You Was Strong: Barry White Introduces Gloria Scott  (Review by Rashod Ollison of The Virginian Pilot)
 Her Best Is Yet to Come: The Return of Gloria Scott  (Interview with Christian John Wikane of Popmatters)

1946 births
Living people
Ike & Tina Turner members
20th-century African-American women singers
American soul singers
Casablanca Records artists